There is a number of works in which people have mentioned or commemorated the Khojaly massacre in popular culture.

Literature

Films

Documentary films 
 2011 – Refugee: a long journey of Anar Yusubov (dir. Cem Oguz)

 2012 – Infinite Corridor / Sonu olmayan dəhliz (dir. Richardas Lopaitis)

Fictional films 
 1993 – The Squall (dir. Jeyhun Mirzayev)
 1993 – Haray (dir. Oruj Gurbanov)
 2012 – Xoca (dir. Vahid Mustafayev)
 2012 – Dolu (dir. Elkhan Jafarov)

Music 
A list of musical works dedicated to the Khojaly Massacre and related events:

Sports 
On 11 May 2014, Turkish footballer Arda Turan of Atlético Madrid was announced as a goodwill ambassador for Khojaly Massacre. Turan's ambassador activities are aimed to raise awareness about this issue and promoting world peace.

References

Azerbaijani culture
Azerbaijani music
Lists of Azerbaijani films
Arts in Azerbaijan
Azerbaijani literature
Works about Khojaly Massacre